Gelechia teleiodella is a moth of the family Gelechiidae. It was described by Mikhail Mikhailovich Omelko in 1986. It is found in the Russian Far East (Primorsky Krai) and China (Gansu, Jilin).

References

Moths described in 1986
Gelechia